Saint Patricks College is an Australian independent Roman Catholic single-sex secondary day school for girls located in Campbelltown in south-western Sydney, New South Wales. Established in 1840, it was the first school built by private enterprises in New South Wales and provides a religious and comprehensive education for approximately 850 students from Year 7 to Year 12, in the traditions of the Sisters of the Good Samaritan.

The current principal is Sue Lennox.

History

St Patrick's College was established in 1840. It was the first school built by private enterprise in the colony of New South Wales and was the result of the initiative of the Catholic people of the Campbelltown area in association with the priest responsible for the district, Fr Gould.

This original school was built on three acres of land donated by Mary Sheil, wife of Dennis Sheil and daughter of local pioneer, William Bradbury and named St Patrick's. The original building still stands today and is now known as ‘Quandong’, which houses the Campbelltown Historic Exhibition, Tourist Information Centre and the St Patrick's museum.

Teachers from the general community staffed this early St Patrick's until 1887 when the Sisters of the Good Samaritan assumed responsibility for the school. In 1888, after the completion of the new St John's church in Cordeaux Street, a convent and school was established at the 'old’ St John's ‘on the hill’ building and took its name from the original St Patrick's at ‘Quandong’.

The final change in location came in 1970 when St Patrick's moved from ‘old’ St John's to its present location. This site was originally a Preparatory School for Boys named St John's or "Westview" and was also conducted by the Sisters of the Good Samaritan. From 1970 until today the College has continued to grow and now has an enrolment of over 730 students from Years 7 - 12.

Curriculum
Vocational Education - VET
Business Services, Hospitality - Kitchen Operations

Facilities 

Tennis/Netball/Running Courts
Football Oval
Top Oval
Mary Sheil Function Centre
Caroline Chisholm Art Complex
Helen Foley Centre
Westview Building
Therry Wing
PE Lab
Library
Science Labs
Computer Labs

Student life 

The school's annual activities include:

Combined Dances between Saint Patricks College and St Gregorys College
Musical, Combined between Saint Patricks College and St Gregorys College 
Senior Trivia Night 
PACMAN- Performing Arts Challenge
Saint Patricks Day Cross Country
Saint Patrick’s day
Saint Benedict’s day
Mass
Year 12 Formal

Co-curricular

Yearly co-curricular activities: aerobics, circuit, pump, spin and body combat fitness classes, indoor rock climbing, yoga, dance, ten-pin bowling, tennis, competitive aerobics, martial arts and gymnastics. It is also a compulsory part of activities that all Year 10 students participate in a self-defence course.

Social justice
Environmental Council
St Vincent de Paul
Ministry Outreach
Goodooga Immersion

Sport
Activities
Swimming Carnival
Cross Country
Macarthur Independent Schools Association Sport MISA
Athletics Carnival
Eat it Work it Move it

House system
There are four houses, each named after a significant female figures to Australia:
Chisholm - Yellow House, Named after Caroline Chisholm, known for her involvement with female immigrant welfare in Australia.
Lyons - Blue House, Named after Dame Enid Lyons, known for being the first women to be elected to the Australian House of Representatives and being the first women appointed to the federal Cabinet.
Kenny - Green House, Named after Elizabeth Kenny, known for being an unaccredited nurse who promoted a controversial new approach to the treatment of poliomyelitis.
Gilmore - Red House, Named after Dame Mary Gilmore, known for being an Australian socialist poet and journalist.

Associated schools
St Gregory's College, Campbelltown
John Therry Catholic High
Mount Carmel Catholic College
Magdalene Catholic High

Other Good Samaritan schools
The College is a sister school to other Good Samaritan schools in Australia and overseas - St Marys Star of the Sea College (Wollongong NSW), Mater Dei School (Camden, NSW), Mount St. Benedict College (Pennant Hills NSW), Stella Maris College (Manly NSW), Rosebank College (Five Dock NSW), St. Scholasticas College (Glebe NSW), Mater Christi College (Belgrave VIC), Santa Maria College (Northcote VIC), Lourdes Hill College (Hawthorne QLD), Seiwa Junior and Senior High School (Sasebo Japan), and Kinder School (Bacolod, Philippines).

See also 

 List of Catholic schools in New South Wales
 Catholic education in Australia

References 

Catholic secondary schools in Sydney
Educational institutions established in 1840
Girls' schools in New South Wales
Campbelltown, New South Wales
1840 establishments in Australia
Association of Heads of Independent Girls' Schools
Alliance of Girls' Schools Australasia